Laura Howard (born as Laura Simmons in Chiswick, London, 1977) is an English actress. She is probably best known for her role as Cully Barnaby in the long-running British crime-mystery Police procedural Midsomer Murders.

Biography 
Howard's first major role came in 1992, playing the teenage daughter Tammy Rokeby in the BBC comedy series So Haunt Me. She went on to play Cully as John Nettles' daughter in Midsomer Murders from 1997 to 2011. Howard has also had a starring role in the Jack Rosenthal drama Eskimo Day and its sequel Cold Enough For Snow. Her other UK television credits include Soldier Soldier, The Bill, Doctors and Casualty.

Howard has appeared in numerous UK theatre productions, including the premier of Life of Riley by Alan Ayckbourn. In June 2012 she appeared in Ayckbourn's The Norman Conquests at the Liverpool Playhouse. In 2014 she starred in Invincible by Torben Betts at the Orange Tree Theatre and then its transfer to the St James Theatre, London. In 2016 she appeared in two plays as part of the RSC's Making Mischief Season.

Filmography

Film

Television

References

External links
 
 
 

English television actresses
1977 births
Living people
People from Chiswick
Actresses from London
English film actresses
English stage actresses
English Buddhists
20th-century English actresses
21st-century English actresses